Vento di ponente is an Italian television series.

Cast

Serena Autieri: Francesca Ghiglione 
Enrico Mutti: Marco Decaro
Anna Kanakis: Paola Ghiglione
Paolo Calissano: Guido Mandelli
Maria Monti: Emma Ghiglione
Toni Marsina: Sebastiano Ghiglione
Martine Brochard: Sofia Ghiglione
Cosimo Cinieri: Giacomo Decaro
Benedetta Buccellato: Costanza Decaro
Barbara Rizzo: Stefania Decaro
Giorgio Biavati: Ernesto Rocca
Daniela Poggi: Carlotta Maggi 
Antonio Manzini: Pietro Ferrando
Roberto Alpi: Alberto Cortesi  
Orsetta De Rossi: Giulia Mori
Vincenzo Diglio: Max
Anna Safroncik: Ljuba Moric 
Elena Russo: Marina
Sara D'Amario: Silvia Fossati 
Marius Verdesi: Boris Moric 
Shel Shapiro: Raimond Foster  
Emanuela Rossi: ginecologa
Rodolfo Bigotti: Paolo
Brando Giorgi: Rodolfo Viali
Guido Caprino: Alessandro

See also
List of Italian television series

External links
 

Italian television series
RAI original programming